Mount Tyson is a mountain near Tully within the Tully Gorge National Park, Far North Queensland, Australia. Mount Tyson rises .

See also

 List of mountains of Australia

References

Tyson